Pequea Creek (pronounced PECK-way) is a tributary of the Susquehanna River that runs for  from the eastern border of Lancaster County and Chester County, Pennsylvania to the village of Pequea, about  above the hydroelectric dam at Holtwood along the Susquehanna River in Lancaster County.

The name of the creek is Shawnee for "dust" or "ashes", referring to a clan that once dwelt at the mouth of the creek.

The stream flows through a pastoral landscape farmed extensively by Pennsylvania German farmers, generally members of Mennonite, Amish, and German-speaking Reformed churches. The Old Order Amish in this watershed were historically called Peckwayers to distinguish them from other Amish who lived along the Conestoga River watershed. The course of the stream is generally flat, though the last  flow through a steeper, wooded gorge, rapidly changing from a placid stream to a twisting flume until reaching the last mile, which is backwater from the Susquehanna.

See also
List of rivers of Pennsylvania

References

External links
U.S. Geological Survey: PA stream gaging stations
Old postcard view of Pequea Creek along trolley line near Colemanville, PA
Pequea Creek rapids
history of Conestoga, PA along the Pequea

Rivers of Pennsylvania
Tributaries of the Susquehanna River
Rivers of Lancaster County, Pennsylvania
Rivers of Chester County, Pennsylvania